There are three mobile games in the Ni no Kuni series published by Level-5. The first two were developed by Level-5 in partnership with mobile distribution companies, and were released around the original games in the main series, Dominion of the Dark Djinn and Wrath of the White Witch. The first, Ni no Kuni: Hotroit Stories, is a role-playing game set before the events of the main entries. It follows the story of Oliver and his friend Mark, and their attempts to construct a car. The first chapter was released in December 2010 through Level-5's Roid service. The second game, Ni no Kuni: Daibouken Monsters, is a social card role-playing game in which players collect cards and use them in battles, and use the abilities of characters who have been trapped in the cards. It was released in a partnership with the GREE mobile service in May 2012. The third game, Ni no Kuni: Cross Worlds, is a role-playing game developed by Netmarble, following a beta tester in a fictional virtual reality game. It was released in Japan, South Korea, and Taiwan in June 2021, and worldwide in May 2022.

Ni no Kuni: Hotroit Stories 

Ni no Kuni: Hotroit Stories is an episodic role-playing video game developed and published by Level-5. The first chapter was released for mobile devices through the Roid service on December 9, 2010.

A prequel to Dominion of the Dark Djinn and Wrath of the White Witch, Hotroit Stories follows Oliver and his friend Mark, who create a custom car by finding parts around the town of Hotroit, eventually making their way to an abandoned factory in their search. They are accompanied by a cat. Throughout their search, Oliver and Mark encounter creatures similar to the imajinn/familiars of the main game, which they must fight to proceed. Unlike the main games, Hotroit Stories does not feature magic; characters instead attack using items such as dry ice for similar effects. Anne Lee of Chic Pixel noted that the game features a similar art style to EarthBound (1994).

The game was first teased at a press conference in June 2010, as well as at the Tokyo Game Show in September 2010, before its formal reveal at the Level-5 Vision conference in October 2010. The first and only chapter, titled "Oliver and Mark", was released in December 2010.

Ni no Kuni: Daibouken Monsters 

Ni no Kuni: Daibouken Monsters is a social card role-playing video game developed and published by Level-5. It was released for mobile devices through the GREE service on May 11, 2012.

In the game, players travel to a different world and collect cards featuring creatures known as "Imajinn", of which there are over 200. An occupant of the other world is trapped in every card; by flipping the card, players can use the occupant's abilities during battles. Rare cards are also available, granting players powers such as improved recovery and special attacks. The game also features a cooperative multiplayer mode, in which two players defend against a boss encounter in a "Raid" battle; there are over 40 bosses in the game. All of the cards were redesigned in June 2012.

The team at GREE initially contacted Level-5 to create individual games for the platform; this eventually developed into a comprehensive partnership between the two companies, resulting in Level-5 developing three titles for GREE. Early registrations for the game began on March 21, 2012. The game was available for Android and iOS devices, through a membership with the GREE service. The game's servers were terminated on September 28, 2012.

Ni no Kuni: Cross Worlds 

Ni no Kuni: Cross Worlds is a free-to-play role-playing video game developed by Netmarble and published by Level-5 for Android, iOS, and Windows. The game was revealed in November 2019 and was released for Android and iOS in Japan, South Korea, and Taiwan on June 10, 2021, and globally for Android, iOS, and Windows on May 25, 2022. Cross Worlds was created using Unreal Engine 4.

The game's story follows a beta tester for a fictional virtual reality game called Soul Diver, which transports them to the world of Ni no Kuni. Within Soul Diver, they meet an AI character named Rania before a glitch crashes the game. The character awakens in a burning city where they save the Queen, who is revealed to be the parallel version of Rania. The world is based on the one from Dominion of the Dark Djinn and Wrath of the White Witch. The game features five character classes: Destroyer, Engineer, Rogue, Swordsman, and Witch. It also has two gameplay modes: Kingdom Mode is a cooperative multiplayer mode wherein players can explore the world with their Imajinn; and Team Arena is a competitive multiplayer mode where six players compete in two teams to collect the most Higgledies.

Level-5 president and CEO Akihiro Hino approached Netmarble in early 2018 with a proposal for an MMORPG based on Ni no Kuni, having been impressed with its previous game Lineage 2: Revolution. Netmarble general producer Bum-jin Park felt that the artistic style of the series would work well on mobile devices, though noted that it caused some trouble as the development team wanted to preserve its value. The game was developed independently by Netmarble based on initial guidelines presented by Level-5. Its three-year development involved core members of the team from Lineage 2: Revolution. Cross Worlds generated  in revenue in its first two weeks; it was the second highest-grossing game globally in that period behind Honor of Kings. Japan accounted for 45% of the revenue, while South Korea represented 35%, and Taiwan around 15.7%.

Notes

References

2010 video games
2012 video games
Fantasy video games
Japan-exclusive video games
Level-5 (company) games
Mobile games
Mobile games
Role-playing video games
Video games developed in Japan
Video games about witchcraft